The Anglican Diocese of Calgary is a diocese of the Ecclesiastical Province of Rupert's Land of the Anglican Church of Canada, located in the southern part of the civil province of Alberta. It was established in 1888. The diocesan boundaries are: on the south, the border between Alberta and the United States; on the east, the Alberta-Saskatchewan border; on the west, the Alberta-British Columbia border and on the north, an uneven east–west line drawn across the province just north of Lacombe forms the northern boundary of the Diocese of Calgary and the southern boundary of the Diocese of Edmonton. This area of about  includes regions of mountain, foothills, parkland and prairie. The see city  is Calgary. Other cities in the diocese are Red Deer, Medicine Hat and Lethbridge.

There are about 9,400 Anglicans and 71 parishes in the diocese, according to the most recent figures published by the church.

References

External links
 Diocese of Calgary official website

 
Calgary, Anglican Diocese of
Religious sees in Alberta
Organizations based in Calgary
Anglican Province of Rupert's Land